The 2018 Vladimir Oblast gubernatorial election was held in September 2018, on common election day.

In the first round, held on 9 September, none of the candidates received an absolute majority. The second round, which was take place on 22 September, came the incumbent Governor Svetlana Orlova, nominated by the United Russia, and Vladimir Sipyagin, nominated by the Liberal Democratic Party.

In the second round Vladimir Sipyagin defeating incumbent Governor Svetlana Orlova.

Candidate
Four candidates were registered to participate in the election

Results

|- style="background-color:#E9E9E9;text-align:center;"
! style="text-align:left;" colspan="2" rowspan="2"| Candidate
! style="text-align:left;" rowspan="2" colspan="2"| Party
! colspan="2"| 1st round
! colspan="2"| 2nd round
|- style="background-color:#E9E9E9;text-align:center;"
! width="75"|Votes
! width="30"|%
! width="75"|Votes
! width="30"|%
|-
| style="background-color:;"|
| style="text-align:left;"| Svetlana Orlova
| style="text-align:left;"| United Russia
| UR
| 
| 36.42
|162,639
|37.46
|-
| style="background-color:;"|
| style="text-align:left;"| Vladimir Sipyagin
| style="text-align:left;"| Liberal Democratic Party
| LDPR
| 
| 31.19
|  
| 57.03
|-
| style="background-color:;"|
| style="text-align:left;"| Sergey Biryukov
| style="text-align:left;"| A Just Russia
| JR
| 
| 17.48
| style="background-color:#E9E9E9;" colspan="2" rowspan="2"|
|-
| style="background-color:;"|
| style="text-align:left;"| Sergey Glumov
| style="text-align:left;"| Patriots of Russia
| PR
| 
| 6.81
|- style="font-weight:bold"
| style="text-align:left;" colspan="4"| Total
| 
| 100.00
|410,269
|100.00
|-
| style="background-color:#E9E9E9;" colspan="8"|
|-
| style="text-align:left;" colspan="4"| Valid votes
| 
| 91,91
|410,269
|94.49
|-
| style="text-align:left;" colspan="4"| Blank ballots
| 
| 8.09
|23,918
|5.51
|-
| style="text-align:left;" colspan="4"| Turnout
| 
| 32.96
|434,284
|38.29
|-
| style="text-align:left;" colspan="4"| Registered voters
| 
| style="background-color:#E9E9E9;"|
| 1,134,328
| style="background-color:#E9E9E9;"|
|-
| style="background-color:#E9E9E9;" colspan="8"|
|-
| style="text-align:left;font-size:90%;" colspan="8"|
Official results published by the Vladimir Oblast Electoral Commission
|}

References

Vladimir Oblast
September 2018 events in Russia
Politics of Vladimir Oblast